Barraina is a genus of jumping spiders, first described by B. J. Richardson in 2013.

Species 
 it contains six species, found only in Australia:

 Barraina abbedar Richardson, 2022 — New South Wales
 Barraina anfracta Richardson, 2013 — Queensland
 Barraina banyabba Richardson, 2022 — New South Wales
 Barraina melanoros Richardson, 2022 — Capital Territory
 Barraina occidentalis Richardson, 2022 — Western Australia
 Barraina pilata Richardson, 2022 — New South Wales

References

Salticidae
Spiders of Australia